This is the list of notable stars in the constellation Cassiopeia, sorted by decreasing brightness.

References

List
Cassiopeia